Empire from the Ashes is an omnibus collection of science fiction novels by American writer David Weber.

Published in 2003 by Baen Books, it is an omnibus reissue of Weber's Dahak trilogy, including Mutineers' Moon, The Armageddon Inheritance and Heirs of Empire.

Plot 
The trilogy's protagonist is Colin MacIntyre, who is on a routine training flight over the Moon when it reveals itself to be Dahak, a self-aware space battle planetoid millennia old. MacIntyre and Dahak defeat Dahak's previous enemies and restore a galactic empire.

See also
 Moonfall (film), a 2022 American science fiction film about the Moon being a spaceship from a fallen human civilization that seeded the Earth with humanity

External links 
 An excerpt of Empire from the Ashes is available for download or reading online at the Baen Free Library here. The whole novel can be found here.
 On January 8, 2014, David Weber stated on his official forums that there are "two Dahak sequels I have plotted out", although there is no planned release date.

2003 American novels
American science fiction novels
Baen Books available as e-books
Military science fiction novels
Novels by David Weber
Space opera novels